Kråkenes Lighthouse is a coastal lighthouse in Kinn Municipality in Vestland, Norway.  It is located on a rocky, knife-like promontory jutting out of the northwestern tip of the island of Vågsøy.

History
It was first lit in 1906 and automated in 1986.    The original lighthouse was destroyed by fire following an Allied air raid in 1945.  The current lighthouse now houses a restaurant and has rooms available for overnight accommodations.

The building is white and the lighthouse portion has a red roof.

See also

 List of lighthouses in Norway
 Lighthouses in Norway

References

External links

 Norsk Fyrhistorisk Forening 

Lighthouses completed in 1906
Lighthouses in Vestland
Kinn
1906 establishments in Norway